The Tuxpan River, also known as the Coahuayana River is a river of Mexico. It originates in the Trans-Mexican Volcanic Belt south of Lake Chapala. It flows southwards through Tuxpan Municipality, Jalisco, and then forms the eastern border of Colima with Michoacán before emptying into the Pacific Ocean.

See also
List of rivers of Mexico

References

Atlas of Mexico, 1975 (http://www.lib.utexas.edu/maps/atlas_mexico/river_basins.jpg).
The Prentice Hall American World Atlas, 1984.
Rand McNally, The New International Atlas, 1993.

Rivers of Jalisco